The following lists present the current title holders of each surfing theme.

Largest (measured) waves surfed

Other claims
There are various ways to measure the height of a wave. Miguel Moreira, professor at University of Lisbon's Faculty of Human Kinetics (FMHUL) denotes that "in order to announce world records, all waves should be measured using the same method". WSL has its own method of measuring the height of a wave and has partnered with Guinness World Records to award world record certificates. Below are some claims of surfed waves that were/are not yet recognized by WSL:

Andrew Cotton - In January 2014, Cotton, was towed into an estimated 80-foot (24.3 meters) wave at Praia do Norte. His feat has yet to be ratified by Guinness World Records.
António Laureano - On 29 October 2020, Laureano, 18 at the time, rode a wave estimated by FMHUL to be around 101.4 feet (30.9 meters) at Praia do Norte. This measurement is still awaiting confirmation by WSL.
The wave was deemed by Billabong as a "partial ride" (meaning he did not ride it to completion).
Carlos Burle - On the 28th October, 2013, Burle rode a wave that was claimed to be 100 feet on Praia do Norte.
Garrett McNamara - Apart from his 2011 world record, McNamara has reportedly surfed to what was dubbed by the media as a "100 foot wave" on 28 January 2013 at Praia do Norte. McNamara has said in a 2013 interview he never claimed the wave to be 100 feet, but said the wave definitely felt bigger than the previous record.

Longest kitesurfing journeys

Longest wave surfed by a dog

References

Surfing
Surfing
Sports records and statistics